The Bolshoy Yugan is a river in Russia, it flows through the territory of Surgutsky and Nefteyugansky Districts of Khanty-Mansi Autonomous Okrug. A left tributary of the Ob, it discharges into the Yuganskaya Ob, a branch of the Ob.

Its source is in the Vasyugan Swamp, it flows through the wetlands of the West Siberian Plain. It has many tributaries, the largest of which is the right Maly Yugan. The river is snow fed. It stays frozen from October to early May.

Major settlements from the mouth to the source: Yugan, Maloyugansky, Ugut, Kogonchiny, Kayukovy, Taurova, Taylakovo, Larlomkiny.

Water register data 
According to the State Water Registry of Russia, the river is part of the Upper Ob Basin District, water management section of the river is the Ob from the city of Nefteyugansk to the confluence of the Irtysh, sub-basin of the river is the Ob below the Vakh to the confluence of the Irtysh. River basin is the (Upper) Ob to the confluence of the Irtysh.

References

Rivers of Khanty-Mansi Autonomous Okrug